Coxsackie Light was a lighthouse near the town of Coxsackie, New York on the northerly end of the Low island northerly of Coxsackie island and on the westerly side of the main channel of the Hudson River.

The lighthouse was first established in 1830 and the last tower was first lit in 1868.  The lighthouse was deactivated in 1940.  The lighthouse was a red square tower with granite trimmings and a red dwelling on stone pier.  The lantern housing was black.  The light was 32 feet high fixed white light.  The original lens was a sixth order Fresnel lens.

The Archives Center at the Smithsonian National Museum of American History has a collection (#1055) of souvenir postcards of lighthouses and has digitized 272 of these and made them available online.  These include postcards of Coxsackie Light  with links to customized nautical charts provided by National Oceanographic and Atmospheric Administration.

References

External links 

Coast Guard list of Lighthouses
Coast Guard list of assets
 Smithsonian National Museum of American History page on Coxsackie

Lighthouses completed in 1830
Lighthouses completed in 1868
Houses completed in 1868
Lighthouses in New York (state)
Hudson River
1830 establishments in New York (state)
Transportation buildings and structures in Greene County, New York